Mitchell Lewis (June 26, 1880 – August 24, 1956) was an American film actor whose career as a Metro-Goldwyn-Mayer contract player encompassed both silent and sound films.  

Born in 1880, Lewis appeared in more than 175 films between 1914 and 1956, although many of the roles in his later films were uncredited. He played supporting roles, such as Sheihk Idrim in 1925's Ben Hur in the silent era and Ernest Defarge in A Tale of Two Cities (1935) in the sound era, but his career would diminish to small uncredited roles like the Captain of the Winkie Guards in The Wizard of Oz (1939). His last film was The Fastest Gun Alive, starring Glenn Ford and Broderick Crawford, which was released shortly before Lewis' death in 1956. Mitchell also served as one of the original board members of the Motion Picture Relief Fund, now known as the Motion Picture & Television Fund.

Selected filmography

 The Million Dollar Mystery (1914, Serial) - Gang Leader
 Zudora (1914)
 The Come-Back (1916) - Bully Bill
 The Flower of No Man's Land (1916) - Kahoma
 The Barrier (1917) - Poleon Doret
 The Bar Sinister (1917) - Ben Swift
 The Sign Invisible (1918) - Lone Deer
 Nine-Tenths of the Law (1918) - Jules Leneau
 Life's Greatest Problem (1918) - Big Steve Reardon
 Code of the Yukon (1918) - Jean Dubois
 Calibre 38 (1919) - Austin Brandt
 Children of Banishment (1919) - Dick Bream
 Fool's Gold (1919) - Marshall Strong
 Jacques of the Silver North (1919) - Jacques La Rouge
 The Faith of the Strong (1919) - Paul La Rue
 The Last of His People (1919) - Lone Wolf - aka Wolf Briggs
 The Mutiny of the Elsinore (1920) - John Pike
 Burning Daylight (1920) - Burning Daylight
 At the End of the World (1921) - Donald MacGregor
 Salomé (1922) - Herod, Tetrarch of Judea
 The Siren Call (1922) - Beauregard, a trapper
 On the High Seas (1922) - Joe Polack
 The Marriage Chance (1922) - The Mute
 The Woman Conquers (1922) - Lazar
Her Accidental Husband (1923) - Old Blind Goring
 The Little Girl Next Door (1923) - Tug Wilson
Rupert of Hentzau (1923) - Bauer
 The Spoilers (1923) - Marshal Voorhees
 The Destroying Angel (1923) - 'Strangler' Olsen
 Gold Madness (1923) - Soctty McGee
 A Prince of a King (1923) - Andrea, the giant
 The Miracle Makers (1923) - Bill Bruce
 Half-A-Dollar-Bill (1924) - Papeete Joe
 Three Weeks (1924) - Vassili
 The Red Lily (1924) - D'Agut
 The Mine with the Iron Door (1924) - Sonora Jack
 Flaming Love (1925) - Osner
 The Crimson Runner (1925) - Conrad (the black)
 Tracked in the Snow Country (1925) - Jules Renault
 The Mystic (1925) - Zazarack
 Ben-Hur (1925) - Sheik Ilderim
 Typhoon Love (1926)
 Wild Oats Lane (1926) - The Bum
 Miss Nobody (1926) - Harmony
 The Sea Wolf (1926) - Johansen, the Mate
 The Last Frontier (1926) - Lige
 The Eagle of the Sea (1926) - Crackley
 Old Ironsides (1926) - Pirate Chief (uncredited)
 Tell It to the Marines (1926) - Native
 Hard-Boiled Haggerty (1927) - Maj. Cotton
 Back to God's Country (1927) - Jean DeBois
 Beau Sabreur (1928) - Suleman the Strong
 Tenderloin (1928) - The Professor
 The Hawk's Nest (1928) - James Kent
 The Way of the Strong (1928) - Handsome Williams
 Out with the Tide (1928) - Captain Lund
The Speed Classic (1928) - Mr. Thornton
 The Docks of New York (1928) - Andy, the Third Engineer
 The Devil Bear (1929) - Jack Crawford
 The Leatherneck (1929) - Court-Martial Officer
 One Stolen Night (1929) - Blossom
 The Bridge of San Luis Rey (1929) - Capt. Alvarado
 Linda (1929) - Stillwater
 The Black Watch (1929) - Mohammed Khan
 Madame X (1929) - Colonel Hanby
 Girl of the Port (1930) - McEwen
 Beau Bandit (1930) - Colosso
 Mammy (1930) - Hank Smith / Tambo
 The Bad One (1930) - Borloff
 The Cuckoos (1930) - Julius
 See America Thirst (1930) - Screwy O'Toole
 Never the Twain Shall Meet (1931) - Captain Larrieau
 Son of India (1931) - Hamid
 The Squaw Man (1931) - Tabywana
 Business and Pleasure (1932) - Hadj Ali (uncredited)
 The World, the Flesh, the Devil (1932) - Sukhanov
 New Morals for Old (1932) - Bodvin
 McKenna of the Mounted (1932) - Pierre - Henchman
 Kongo (1932) - Hogan
 The Secret of Madame Blanche (1933) - M. Duval
 Ann Vickers (1933) - Captain Waldo
 The Count of Monte Cristo (1934) - Vampa
 Marie Galante (1934) - Yermack - Steamship Crew Member (uncredited)
 Red Morning (1934) - Captain Perava
 The Best Man Wins (1935) - Joe Martini (uncredited)
 Oil for the Lamps of China (1935) - Skipper of Ship (uncredited)
 The Farmer Takes a Wife (1935) - Boatman in Office (uncredited)
 A Tale of Two Cities (1935) - Ernest Defarge
 The Bohemian Girl (1936) - Salinas
 Sutter's Gold (1936) - King Kamehameha
 Fatal Lady (1936) - Magistrate (uncredited)
 Dancing Pirate (1936) - Pirate Chief
 Anthony Adverse (1936) - White Man Whipping Slave (uncredited)
 Mummy's Boys (1936) - Haroun Pasha
 Espionage (1937) - Sondheim
 Waikiki Wedding (1937) - Koalani
 The Emperor's Candlesticks (1937) - Plainclothesman (uncredited)
 Big City (1937) - Detective Haley (uncredited)
 Conquest (1937) - Beppo (uncredited)
 The Bad Man of Brimstone (1937) - Jake Mulligan (uncredited)
 Arsène Lupin Returns (1938) - Detective (uncredited)
 Three Comrades (1938) - Boris (uncredited)
 Rich Man, Poor Girl (1938) - Man Who Yells (voice, uncredited)
 Mysterious Mr. Moto (1938) - Nola
 Stand Up and Fight (1939) - Cheating Gambler (uncredited)
 Idiot's Delight (1939) - Chief Wahoo (uncredited)
 Let Freedom Ring (1939) - Joe (uncredited)
 Sergeant Madden (1939) - Officer Minetti (uncredited)
 Bridal Suite (1939) - Hotel Runner at Train Station (uncredited)
 6,000 Enemies (1939) - Prisoner Milky (uncredited)
 The Wizard of Oz (1939) - the Captain of the Winkie Guards (uncredited)
 Blackmail (1939) - Workman (scenes deleted)
 Bad Little Angel (1939) - Fireman Telling Wilks Tommy Went Into Fire (uncredited)
 The Secret of Dr. Kildare (1939) - Adam - Nora's Gardener (uncredited)
 Henry Goes Arizona (1939) - Rancher Bull Carson (uncredited)
 Young Tom Edison (1940) - McGuire - Train Engineer (uncredited)
 Strange Cargo (1940) - Guard (uncredited)
 20 Mule Team (1940) - Barfly at Bar (uncredited)
 Florian (1940) - Horse Dealer (uncredited)
 Gold Rush Maisie (1940) - William Howard Taft Miggs (uncredited)
 I Love You Again (1940) - Sailor Yelling 'Man Overboard' (uncredited)
 Boom Town (1940) - Venezuelan Foreman (uncredited)
 Gallant Sons (1940) - Newspaper Buyer (uncredited)
 Go West (1940) - Halfbreed Indian Pete (uncredited)
 Meet John Doe (1941) - Bennett
 I'll Wait for You (1941) - Alfred 'Al'
 Billy the Kid (1941) - Bart Hodges
 The Big Store (1941) - Indian Father (uncredited)
 Honky Tonk (1941) - Man #1 Agreeing with Candy (uncredited)
 Kid Glove Killer (1942) - Restaurant Proprietor (uncredited)
 Rio Rita (1942) - Julio aka Pete
 I Married an Angel (1942) - Hotel Porter (uncredited)
 Cairo (1942) - Ludwig
 Apache Trail (1942) - Bolt Saunders (uncredited)
 Du Barry Was a Lady (1943) - Rebel Opening Door (uncredited)
 I Dood It (1943) - Greek Taffy Man (scenes deleted)
 The Cross of Lorraine (1943) - French Villager (uncredited)
 Whistling in Brooklyn (1943) - Bearded Baseball Spectator (uncredited)
 The Seventh Cross (1944) - Prisoner at Concentration Camp (uncredited)
 Kismet (1944) - Sheik (uncredited)
 An American Romance (1944) - Detroit Auto Works Technician (uncredited)
 Lost in a Harem (1944) - Slave (uncredited)
 The Thin Man Goes Home (1944) - Third Man Outside Barber Shop (uncredited)
 Main Street After Dark (1945) - Plainclothesman (uncredited)
 The Picture of Dorian Gray (1945) - Waiter (uncredited)
 The Harvey Girls (1946) - Sandy (uncredited)
 The Green Years (1946) - Smithy (uncredited)
 Courage of Lassie (1946) - Gil Elson
 The Mighty McGurk (1947) - Bartender (uncredited)
 It Happened in Brooklyn (1947) - Printer (uncredited)
 The Romance of Rosy Ridge (1947) - Southerner (uncredited)
 Song of the Thin Man (1947) - Jailkeeper (uncredited)
 Merton of the Movies (1947) - Set Guard (uncredited)
 Desire Me (1947) - Old Man (uncredited)
 Tenth Avenue Angel (1948) - Vendor's Bystander (uncredited)
 Julia Misbehaves (1948) - Railroad Manager (uncredited)
 The Kissing Bandit (1948) - Fernando (uncredited)
 Take Me Out to the Ball Game (1949) - Fisherman (uncredited)
 The Stratton Story (1949) - Conductor (uncredited)
 Border Incident (1949) - Older Bracero (uncredited)
 The Toast of New Orleans (1950) - Minor Role (uncredited)
 Dial 1119 (1950) - (uncredited)
 Two Weeks with Love (1950) - Mr. Schimpf (uncredited)
 Kim (1950) - Farmer Going to Ambala (uncredited)
 Inside Straight (1951) - Immigrant (uncredited)
 Mr. Imperium (1951) - Old Watchman (uncredited)
 The Painted Hills (1951) - Mark Miller (uncredited)
 The Tall Target (1951) - Sleeping Train Passenger (uncredited)
 Callaway Went Thataway (1951) - Studio Guard (uncredited)
 The Man with a Cloak (1951) - Waiter
 Lone Star (1952) - Senator (uncredited)
 Talk About a Stranger (1952) - Orchard Owner (uncredited)
 Scaramouche (1952) - Majordomo (uncredited)
 Washington Story (1952) - Spectator (uncredited)
 The Merry Widow (1952) - The King's Page with pistol (uncredited)
 Million Dollar Mermaid (1952) - Violinist (uncredited)
 Sky Full of Moon (1952) - Garage Owner (uncredited)
 Lili (1953) - Concessionaire (uncredited)
 The Sun Shines Bright (1953) - Sheriff Andy Redcliffe
 I Love Melvin (1953) - Stage Doorman (uncredited)
 A Slight Case of Larceny (1953) - Court Clerk (uncredited)
 Torch Song (1953) - Bill the Doorman (uncredited)
 Kiss Me Kate (1953) - Stage Doorman (uncredited)
 All the Brothers Were Valiant (1953) - Cook
 Gypsy Colt (1954) - Ed (uncredited)
 The Student Prince (1954) - Chess Partner (uncredited)
 Trial (1955) - Jury Foreman (uncredited)
 The Fastest Gun Alive (1956) - Tucker Eddy (uncredited)

Notes
Although uncredited in The Wizard of Oz, he had several lines towards the end of the film, including: "She's dead. You killed her." "Hail to Dorothy! The Wicked Witch is dead!" and, in response to Dorothy's request for the late witch's broomstick, "Please!  And take it with you!".

References

External links

1880 births
1956 deaths
American male film actors
American male silent film actors
Male actors from Syracuse, New York
20th-century American male actors
Burials at Forest Lawn Memorial Park (Glendale)